Gunther Park (now Chase Park) was a semi-professional baseball park in Chicago, Illinois. The field site was a large block bounded by Clark Street (east), Leland Avenue (south) and Ashland Avenue (west), and was built in 1905. It was just 11 blocks north of Wrigley Field., and held a capacity of approximately 5,000.

A handful of local amateur football and baseball games were played at the location in late autumn of 1904, the first being held on November 2.[Chicago Tribune, November 3, 1904, p. 8] The venue was initially called "Gunther's Park".

After housing the Gunther Nine of the Chicago City League and the Chicago Green Sox of the outlaw and short-lived United States Baseball League, as well as many other local amateur sporting events, the site was redeveloped in 1920. It was converted into a recreational park for the benefit of the Ravenswood district, with tennis courts, basketball courts, playgrounds, baseball fields, soccer fields, and pools. It was renamed in honor of Salmon P. Chase.[Chicago Tribune, December 9, 1920, p. 17]

References 

Chicago Green Sox
United States Baseball League venues
1905 establishments in Illinois
Sports venues completed in 1905
1913 disestablishments in Illinois